Raja Prithu (also known as Jalpeswara) is assumed to be a king of the early medieval period in the present-day state of Assam, India and Bangladesh. Archeological remains of a Shiva temple and extensive fortifications in present-day Jalpaiguri in India and present day Rangpur District of Bangladesh are  attributed to him.

Identity of king Prithu

K. L. Barua claimed that the throne of Kamarupa was occupied by a king named Prithu after the end of the Vaidyadeva line. He credits this Prithu with the achievement of having defeated  Muhammad bin Bakhtiyar. Though N. K. Bhattasali asserts that the Prithu mentioned in the Tabaqat-i-Nasiri was a king from Awadh, many scholars support the view that Minhaj himself was mistaken. Recent scholarship tentatively identifies Prithu mentioned in Minhaj's Tabaqat-i Nasiri with Visvasundara of Kamarupa.

Khalji's encounter with the Rai of Kamrup

In 1206, Muhammad bin Bakhtiyar Khalji planned to invade Tibet, in order to plunder the treasures of the Buddhist monasteries and gain control of Bengal's traditional trade route with South East Asia for which he had to pass through Kamrup and Sikkim. 
By this time Khalji had massacred 10,000 monks of Nalanda and had burned it down. Then he came to Bengal which was won without a fight as the king of Bengal Laksman Sena took flight, never to be heard of again. But he had heard of the valour of the Rai of Kamrud (as mentioned by Islamic chronicler
Sirajuddin Minhajuddin in his Tabaqat-i Nasiri) and how he led an army that would fight with an almost demonic ferocity he thought it better to befriend him as he had to pass through the Rai's realm. So, he sent emissaries for forming an alliance. The Kamrup king  told him that he too wanted to attack Southern Tibet. So he proposed the idea of attacking Southern Tibet jointly. But then he informed Khalji's emissaries that the time was not right. As the rainy season was about to start, leading to great hardship, and perilous ascent to the mountains it was advisable to start the campaign after one season. But Khalji by that time had already arrived and was camping right in the present-day Siliguri in North Bengal.

So he found a local guide belonging to a tribe named Mech who could show him a route through Bhutan, that could bypass Kamrud as the Islamic forces use to pronounce Kamrup. But at first, Mech was converted to Islam and hence he was the first convert in the region, Ali Mech. So the latter took Khalji's army through the mountainous passes and defiles of Bhutan. 
At first, after reaching Southern Tibet they had some degree of success as they looted the riches of the Buddhist Gompa or monasteries. But then the Monpas described as Mongols came and attacked them from all sides. Their return journey was cut off. And in the meantime, the rainy season started and many died due to pestilence and diseases. Their rations were diminishing. A time came when they used to kill and eat their horses. Khalji then thought that since they cannot go back the way they had come they have to find a way to Kamrup and proceeded towards it. But when they were noticed by the spies of the Kamrup king, they thought that Khalji had attacked their realm. So when the Rai was informed, he made plans to lure them to the point where a river named as Begmati (some scholars identify the river as the Teesta river) referred in Tabaqat-i Nasiri  fall into the Brahmaputra. 

The Rai of Kamrup allowed Bakhtiyar Khalji's army to advance unchecked into his kingdom, in order to draw him away from his base of operations. He followed a scorched earth strategy, denying his enemy the opportunity to replenish their supplies and destroyed a bridge across a deep river that Bakhtiyar Khalji's army had already crossed, thus cutting off their retreat. The invading force encountered stiff resistance upon entering the rough mountainous terrain of Tibet and decided to retreat. However, the retreat and the attempt to cross the river were disastrous as his forces were short on supplies and were attacked from all sides by Rai's forces. He made stockades of phanjis or spiked bamboos and drew the whole surviving army of thirty thousand into a gully and attacked them and mercilessly cut them down.
Practically his whole army of  horsemen and  infantry were totally annihilated.

Death
Raja Prithu is believed to have been killed in battle with Nasir-ud-din Mahmud in 1228 AD. Some accounts say that Raja Prithu jumped into a tank and killed himself to save dishonour. No reference to this expedition can be had from the Muslim chronicle Tabaquat-i-Nasiri except the following: The accursed Bartu (Britu), beneath whose sword above a hundred and twenty thousand Musalmans had attained martyrdom, he (Nasiruddin) overthrew and sent to hell.

References

Bibliography

 
 

History of Assam
Hindu monarchs
12th-century Indian monarchs
13th-century Indian monarchs
1228 deaths
Year of birth unknown